The Winnsboro Commercial Historic District is a  historic district located along Prairie Street in Winnsboro in Franklin Parish, Louisiana.

When first created, the district comprised a total of 31 structures, mainly one-story brick commercial buildings, of which 20 were considered contributing properties. After a reexamination, the district now comprises 22 contributing properties on a total of 28 buildings.

The historic district was listed on the National Register of Historic Places on July 9, 1982.

Contributing Properties

The historical district contains a total of 22 contributing properties, built between c.1905 and c.1945:
Building at 600-604 Prairie Street, built c.1915.
Building at 608 Prairie Street, built 1911. No more existing
Building at 612-614 Prairie Street, built c.1945.
Building at 616 Prairie Street, built c.1925.
Building at 618 Prairie Street, built c.1915.
Building at 702 Prairie Street, built c.1915.
Building at 710 Prairie Street, built c.1915.
Princess Theater, at 714 Prairie Street, built c.1915.
Princess Room, at 720 Prairie Street, built c.1915.
Building at 503-505 Prairie Street, built 1920s.
Old Post Office, at 513 Prairie Street, built 1936. Now hosting the Old Post Office Museum.
Building at 607 Prairie Street, built c.1915.
Building at 611 Prairie Street, built c.1915.
Building at 613 Prairie Street, built c.1905.
Building at 617-621 Prairie Street, built c.1945.
Building at 623 Prairie Street, built c.1905.
Building at 701-703 Prairie Street, built c.1915.
Franklin Parish Public Library, at 705 Prairie Street, built c.1915.
Commercial Building #1, built c.1915. Now hosting the Franklin Parish Library Learning Center.
Building at 713-717 Prairie Street, built c.1915.
Building at 719-721 Prairie Street, built c.1915.
Building at 801-803 Prairie Street, built c.1915.

See also
National Register of Historic Places listings in Franklin Parish, Louisiana

External links
Old Post Office Museum website
Franklin Parish Library website

References

Historic districts on the National Register of Historic Places in Louisiana
Colonial Revival architecture in Louisiana
Buildings designated early commercial in the National Register of Historic Places
Buildings and structures completed in 1890
Franklin Parish, Louisiana